Polylepis rugulosa, the queñua, is a species of plant in the family Rosaceae. It is primarily found in the Andes region of South America in Argentina, Bolivia, Chile and Peru. It is currently threatened by habitat loss.

This is a small tree, which is unable to grow more than 4 metres in height. It features a reddish-brown bark with brilliant compound leaves. The tree's fruit and flowers are generally unnoticeable since they are shrouded by the tree's foliage.

Images

Sources

rugulosa
Flora of the Andes
Páramo flora
Trees of Chile
Trees of Bolivia
Trees of Peru
Drought-tolerant trees
Vulnerable plants
Taxonomy articles created by Polbot